Angamiana is a genus of cicadas from Southeast Asia

List of species
 Angamiana aetherea Distant, 1890
 Angamiana floridula Distant, 1904
 Angamiana vemacula (Chou and Yao, 1986)

References

Fauna of Southeast Asia
Taxa named by William Lucas Distant
Polyneurini
Cicadidae genera